Henry Charles Beeching (15 May 1859 – 25 February 1919) was a British clergyman, author and poet, who was Dean of Norwich from 1911 to 1919.

Biography
Beeching was born on 15 May 1859 in Sussex, the son of J. P. G. Beeching of Bexhill. He was educated at the City of London School and at Balliol College, Oxford. He took holy orders in 1882, and began work in a Liverpool parish at Mossley Hill. He was Rector of Yattendon from 1885 to 1900; Clark Lecturer at Trinity College, Cambridge in 1900; professor of Pastoral Theology at King's College London from 1900 to 1903; Chaplain of Lincoln's Inn from 1900 to 1903; Canon of Westminster Abbey from October 1902 until 1911 and Dean of Norwich from 1911 until his death. He wrote a book on Francis Atterbury.
To him is attributed the popular epigram on Benjamin Jowett:
 
First come I; my name is Jowett.
There's no knowledge but I know it.
I am master of this college:
What I don't know isn't knowledge.

This is the first verse of The Masque of B-ll—l (1880), a scurrilous undergraduate production in 40 verses satirising Balliol figures. It was suppressed at the time. Later research has given Beeching credit for 19 of the verses.

Works
Love in Idleness: A Volume of Poems (1883) with J. W. Mackail and J. B. B. Nichols
Love's Looking Glass (1892) with J. W. Mackail and J. B. B. Nichols
A Paradise of English Poetry (1893), an anthology of English poets
Pages from a Private Diary (1898), originally published anonymously

Notes

Bibliography 

 "Beeching, Henry Charles (1859-1919)", Hugh Chisholm (ed.) Encyclopædia Britannica. 3 (11th ed.). Cambridge University Press, 1908.
 "Beeching, Henry Charles (1859-1919)", H. C. G. Matthew (ed.) Oxford Dictionary of National Biography. Oxford University Press, 2004.

External links

 
 
 

1859 births
1919 deaths
People educated at the City of London School
Deans of Norwich
Canons of Westminster
English male poets
Alumni of Balliol College, Oxford
Academics of King's College London